Cluden is an outer southern suburb of Townsville in the City of Townsville, Queensland, Australia. In the  Cluden had a population of 427 people.

History 
The suburb takes its name from a property name used by James Gordon (1822-1904), Sub-Collector of Customs in Townsville from 1865. The name is probably referring to Cluden Water, a stream in Scotland near his birthplace in Dumfries.

The presence of the Cluden railway station on the North Coast railway line prompted the relocation of the racecourse from central Townsville to a new site near the railway station called Cluden Racecourse to enable people from a wider area to attend the races through the convenience of travelling by rail. The railway station has subsequently closed.

In the 2011 census, Cluden had a population of 509 people.

In the  Cluden had a population of 427 people.

Heritage listings
The grandstand, former totalisator building and main entrance gates at Cluden Racecourse at 1 Racecourse Road  are listed on the Queensland Heritage Register.

Education 
There are no schools in Cluden. The nearest primary school is Oonoonba State School in neighbouring Idalia to the west. The nearest secondary school is William Ross State High School in neighbouring Annandale to the south-west.

References

External links

 

Suburbs of Townsville